St Anne's School, Ibadan is a secondary school for girls in Ibadan, Nigeria. The school took its current name in 1950, after a merger between Kudeti Girls School, founded in 1899, and CMS Girls School, Lagos, founded in 1869. It can therefore claim to be the oldest girls secondary school in Nigeria.

CMS Girls School, Lagos

The CMS Female Institution was founded on 1 May 1869, ten years after the Church Missionary Society had founded CMS Grammar School, Lagos as the first boys grammar school in Nigeria. Abigail Macaulay, wife of the boys' school headmaster, and daughter of Bishop Samuel Ajayi Crowther, had pressed for there to be a girls' institution, in order that rich people in Lagos no longer need send their girls abroad to study. The school, situated on what today is Broad Street in Lagos, initially had sixteen pupils. Mrs. Roper was its first principal. In 1891, the name was changed to CMS Girls Seminary, and in 1926 the name was again changed to CMS Girls School.

St Anne's School, Ibadan
In 1950 the school was renamed, in honour of the missionary Anna Hinderer. Anna, and her husband's, tomb had been renovated by Kudeti Girl's School in 1933. The school celebrates its 'birthday' on July 26, the feast day of Saint Anne.

Principals
 Mrs Annie Roper 1869
 Mrs Bonetta Forbes Davies 1870 (acting ). She was the adopted child of Queen Victoria.
 Rev Henry and Mrs Townsend were co-principals 1871-1872
 Rev and Mrs Mann 1872 - 1885
 Mrs Emma Harding née Kerr 1885 - 1886
 Mrs Vernall née Kruse 1886 - 1888
 Miss Marian Goodall 1888 - 1893
 Mrs Fanny Jones née Higgins  (acting) 1894
 Miss Ballson (acting) 1894 - 1905
 Miss Boyton 1906
 Miss Hill  1906 - 1908
 Mrs Wakeman née Towe 1908
 Miss Wait  1910 - 1927
 Miss Mellor 1928 - 1931
 Miss Grimwood 1931 - 1944

 Miss Wedmore  1944 - 1960
 Mrs Bullock née Groves 1960 - 1973
 Mrs F I Ilori (acting) 1973
 Mrs E O T Makinwane 1973 - 1984
 Mrs Nike Ladipo  1984 - 1991
 Mrs O F Osobamiro 1991 - 1994
 Mrs Dupe Babalola 1995 - 2005
 Mrs A A Kolapo  2005 - 2007
 Mrs F I Falomo  2007 - 2014
 Mrs K A Otesile 2014 - 2016
 Mrs T O Orowale 2016 - 2018
 Mrs Y O Awe  2018 - 2020

Notable former teaching staff
 Rev Josiah Ransome Kuti, the grandfather of Fela Kuti, taught music 1879 - 1886
 Professor Margaret Adebisi Sowunmi, née Jadesimi, taught Biology

Alumni

Public service
 Mrs Christie Ade-Ajayi née Martins (born 1930), educational specialist
 Mrs Dorothy Akanya, née Miller, first female commissioner in Nigeria.
 Omoba Tejumade Alakija, née Aderemi (1925-2013), civil servant.
 Professor Bolanle Awe, née Fajembola (born 1933), history professor.
 Mrs Ngozi Okonjo-Iweala (born 1954), director general of the World Trade Organization.
 Mrs Oladayo Oluwole née Adeleke Adedoyin, first female Nigerian Prisons Service Officer.
 Mrs Ibukunade Sijuwola, née Fagunwa, chair of the D.O. Fagunwa Foundation to protect indigenous languages.

Authors
 Flora Nwapa, née Nwakuche (1931-1993), writer.
 Mrs Mabel Segun, née Aig Imokhuede (born 1930), author.

Media
 Mrs Anike Agbaje-Williams, née Kuforiji (born 1934), newsreader.

Law
 Hon Justice Olufunlola Oyelola Adekeye, née Akinlade, Federal  Supreme Court Justice 
 Professor Jadesola Olayinka Akande, née Esan (1940-2008), law professor & Vice Chancellor of Lagos State University.
Justice Dolapo Akinsanya, née Onabamiro (1941-2020), judge.
Justice  Monisola Agbeke Fafiade, née Jacobs (born 1936), jurist. 
Justice Atinuke Omobonike Ige OFR, née Oloko Judge Federal Court of Appeal  (died 2003) .
 Hon Justice Roseline Ajoke Omotosho, née Sonola-Soyinka, (died 1999), Lagos State Chief Judge.

Accountancy, insurance and economics
 Mrs Claire Ighodaro, CBE née Ukpoma. The First Female President of the Chartered Institute of Management Accountants
 Mrs Olutoyin Olakunri, née Adesigbin (1937-2018), accountant and businesswoman

Politics
 Hon Mrs Abiola Babatope, née Odeyale, former Member of the House of Representatives
 Ms Kofoworola Bucknor-Akerele (born 1939), Deputy Governor of Lagos State
 Mrs Gwendoline Etonde Burnley, née Martin (1932-2000), Cameroonian politician.
 Ebiti Ndok-Jegede, Presidential aspirant
 Remi Şonaiya née Fawole (born 1955), Presidential candidate 
 Lady Ime Udom, barrister and politician.

Science, medicine and dentistry
 Professor Ekanem Ikpi Braide (born 1946), parasitologist, President Nigeria Academy of Science. 
 Lady Deborah Jibowu, MBE, OON  née Fasan (1924-2019), Nigeria's first female science graduate.
 Dr Simisola Onibuwe Johnson  (1929-2000), dentist
 Dr Olufunmilayo Olopade, née Falusi (born 1957), oncologist
 Professor Oyinade Olurin, née Odutola, first female professor of medicine in Nigeria.
 Mrs Modupe Olabisi Oluwole, née Ogundipe (1933-2020), pharmacist.
 Dr Marianne Abimbola Silva, née Phillips (1926-2015), medical doctor.
 Professor Emeritus Margaret Adebisi Sowunmi, née Jadesimi  (born 1939), botanist and environmental archaeologist.
 Professor Kudirat Olanike Adeyemo, Veterinary Surgeon

Armed forces
 Major General Aderonkę Kale, army psychiatrist.

Educators
 Mrs Eva Adebayo Adelaja, née Adebonojo founder of Eva Adelaja Girls Grammar School Bariga.
 Mrs Leila Fowler, née Moore  founder of Vivian Fowler Memorial School for Girls
 Mrs Tanimowo Ogunlesi, née Okusanya (1908-2002), women's rights activist and founder of Children's Home School, Ibadan
 Mrs Yetunde Omisade, nee Esan, first principal of the Peoples Girls Grammar School.
 Chief Mrs Gladys Aduke Vaughan, née Akinloye (1920-2014), founder of Omolewa School.

Nursing
 Mrs Kofoworola Abeni Pratt, née Scott (1915-1992), nurse

The Arts
 Mrs Toyin Abraham, née Aimakhu (born 1990), actress and blogger
 Ms Ayo Adesanya, Nollywood Actress in Yoruba and English languages
 Mrs Teni Aofiyebi, née Gbogboade, actress and businessperson

Women's affairs
 Lady Oyinkansola Abayomi, née Ajasa (1897-1990), Nationalist, Feminist, President of the Nigeria Girl Guide Association 
 Mrs Hilda Adefarasin, née Petgrave (born 1925), women's rights activist
 Lady Kofo Ademola, MBE. MFR. OFR.née Moore (1913-2002), First Black African Female University Graduate . Educationist, Founder of Primary & Secondary Schools for Girls, Writer.

Historians and scholars
 Clara Olanrewaju Osinulu, née Odugbesan (born 1934). Anthropologist and first female curator of National Museum of Nigeria.

Business
 Mrs Emily Aig-Imoukhuede, née Meffullhoude (born 1941), business executive.
 Mrs Kehinde Kamson, née Adelaja (born 1961), Entrepreneur

References

Further reading
 Kemi Morgan and Christine Bullock, eds, The making of Good Wives, Good Mothers, Leading Lights of Society. The Story of St Anne's School Ibadan. Y Books & Associated Bookmakers of Nigeria Ltd, 1989.

External links
 About St Anne's

Schools in Ibadan
Secondary schools in Oyo State
Educational institutions established in 1869
Girls' schools in Nigeria
1869 establishments in Africa